The American Law and Economics Association (ALEA), a United States organization founded in 1991, is focused on the advancement of economic understanding of law, and related areas of public policy and regulation. It promotes research in law and economics. The organization's official journal is the American Law and Economics Review, established in 1999.

History
In January 1990, a meeting of scholars was convened by George Mason University Law School dean, Henry Manne, to discuss organizing a professional organization. The association was formally co-founded by George Priest, A. Mitchell Polinsky, and Steven Shavell, each of whom served a term as president during the ensuing decade.

A growing acceptance of legal and economic perspectives by judges, practitioners, and policy-makers became evident in the creation of parallel associations in Australia, Europe, Latin America, and Canada.

Notable members
The founding board of directors was composed of representatives of major universities, including Berkeley, Emory, USC, Columbia, Harvard, Georgetown and MIT. In addition to  Henry Manne, and the three formal founders, Priest, Polinsky, and Shavell, each of whom served a term as president during the ensuing decade; other notable members include:

 Orley Ashenfelter founding co-editor-in-chief, American Law and Economics Review
Robert Cooter, among those convened by Henry Manne prior to formation of ALEA, was elected as a founding board member, and served as its president for 1994
 Robert C. Ellickson, 2000 president
 John J. Donohue III 2011 president
 Gillian Hadfield, board member
 Oliver Hart, 2006 president
 Richard Posner, founding co-editor-in-chief, American Law and Economics Review
 Roland Kirstein
 William M. Landes, 1992 president
 Bruce M. Owen
 Ariel Porat, former board member; president of Tel Aviv University 
 Harold See
 Michael Trebilcock, 2002 president

See also
 Regional and international law and economics associations

References

External links
 Official website

Organizations established in 1991
Legal organizations based in the United States
Business and finance professional associations
Economics societies
Law-related professional associations
Law-related learned societies
1991 establishments in the United States
Law and economics